Boloceroides is a genus of sea anemones in the family Boloceroididae. It is monotypic, the sole species being Boloceroides mcmurrichi. It has a cosmopolitan distribution in tropical and temperate oceans.

References

Boloceroididae
Hexacorallia genera
Monotypic cnidarian genera